YouBar is an online nutrition bar company that makes customized energy bars. The company was established in 2006 by Ava Bise and Anthony Flynn, a mother-son team from Los Angeles, California.

History
Around 1998, Bise started making her own nutrition bars at home. Her son began making his own several years later when he turned 18 years old, and the two would swap recipes. In 2006, Flynn graduated from the University of Southern California with a degree in Business Administration. After starting the business at home in 2006, and later borrowing commercial kitchen space from Ms. Bise's synagogue, Bise and Flynn moved into their own space the following year, not far from the Farmers Market at the Grove. In 2011, the company moved to a new 8,000 square foot facility in Downtown Los Angeles.

Product
YouBar is an online service allowing users to choose the ingredients of their customized nutrition bars and name their personal creation. YouBar then makes, packages, and ships a 13 bars to the customer. The service is designed for people with specific dietary requirements (particularly vegans, athletes and people with allergies) by giving control to the consumer over what goes into the product.

References

External links

Food and drink companies based in California
Dietary supplements